Zhang Shun is a fictional character in Water Margin, one of the Four Great Classical Novels of Chinese literature. Nicknamed "White Stripe in the Waves", he ranks 30th among the 36 Heavenly Spirits, the first third of the 108 Stars of Destiny.

Background
The novel depicts Zhang Shun as six chi tall,  fair in complexion and having a beautiful beard. Nicknamed "White Stripe in the Waves", he is a consummate swimmer who could stay under water for long periods of time.

Zhang Shun and his elder brother Zhang Heng live at Jieyang Ridge (揭陽嶺; believed to be in present-day Jiujiang, Jiangxi) near the Xunyang River. They use a trick to rob travellers who take their boat without taking lives. Zhang Shun would disguise himself as a passenger whom Zhang Heng would throw overboard when he pretends to be unwilling to hand over his valuables. Zhang Shun would make it to shore while the other travellers are so frightened that they surrender all they have. Zhang Shun later moves to Jiangzhou alone (江州; present-day Jiujiang, Jiangxi) where he becomes a fishmonger.

Fight with Li Kui

Soon after he reached the prison camp of Jiangzhou, Song Jiang, in exile from Yuncheng as a mitigated sentence for killing his mistress, becomes friend of the chief warden Dai Zong and jailer Li Kui. They go to dine at a riverside restaurant. Song Jiang suddenly craves for fish, but those available in the restaurant are not fresh. Li Kui immediately goes to the riverside market to get him some. The fishermen refuse to sell him any before the chief fishmonger comes. Too impatient to wait, Li Kui tries to grab fishes from the underwater cages and inadvertently releases them into the river. Zhang Shun, the fishmonger, arrives and fights Li. But he is no match for the burly guy. Fortunately Song Jiang and Dai Zong come by and stop Li Kui from hammering him further. Although Zhang slips away, he challenges Li Kui from a boat. Li jumps onto the boat, which is immediately overturned by Zhang. In the water, Li Kui is completely at the mercy of the fishmonger, who keeps him submerged. As one is fair-skinned and the other dark, their stark contrast in complexion amuses the onlookers each time they bob above the water.

Earlier, when on his way to Jiangzhou, Song Jiang met Zhang Heng at the Jieyang River, who asked him to deliver a letter to his brother. Upon knowing the guy is Zhang Shun, Song calls out his name and mentions the letter. Hearing that, Zhang Shun stops toying with Li Kui and pulls him back to land. He makes peace with Li and the four laugh over the fight.

Joining Liangshan
Song Jiang is arrested and sentenced to death for composing a seditious poem, which he wrote on the wall of a restaurant after getting drunk. The outlaws from Liangshan Marsh hurry to Jiangzhou, storm the execution ground and rescue him and Dai Zong, who is implicated following his attempt to rescue Song. After fleeing Jiangzhou, the group is stranded at a riverbank. Luckily, Zhang Shun, Zhang Heng and other friends of Song Jiang from the Jieyang region arrive in boats on their way to rescue him. Determined to get back at Huang Wenbing, the minor official who reported the seditious poem to the authorities, Song plans an attack on the Wuwei Garrison where Huang lives. Huang is not at home but he runs into Zhang Shun while crossing a river as he hurries back upon seeing his town is on fire. Zhang overturns the boat and captures him in water. Song Jiang kills Huang and joins Liangshan, taking with him the Zhang brothers and others.

Recruiting An Daoquan
When Song Jiang is attacking Daming Prefecture (大名府; present-day Daming County, Hebei) with a force to rescue Lu Junyi and Shi Xiu, he suddenly falls very ill with a tumour on his back. A fever comes on and never subsides, causing him to fall into delirium. Back in Liangshan with the force withdrawn, Song continues to be bedridden, with his condition deteriorating and all medicines to no avail. Zhang Shun, who grew up in the Yangtze region, remembers that his mother once suffered from a similar illness and was healed by a physician An Daoquan. He volunteers to find An in Jiankang Prefecture  (present-day Nanjing, Jiangsu) and bring him to Liangshan.

Zhang Shun comes to the Yangtze and boards the boat of the pirate Zhang Wang. Midway across the river, Zhang Wang pounces on him when he is asleep, ties him up and throws him into the river. An excellent swimmer, Zhang Shun frees himself under water and gets to the opposite bank, where he finds the inn of Wang Dingliu. Wang's father provides him dry clothes and lodgings and introduces his son saying the young man wishes to join Liangshan. Zhang Shun however has to go to Jiankang first to get An Daoquan.

Zhang Shun finds An Daoquan but the physician is unwilling to leave a prostitute called Li Qiaonu whom he is besotted with. Just when Zhang is wondering how to get An to Liangshan, he discovers Li is also patronised by Zhang Wang, who visits the woman one night when An is drunk at her place. Zhang Shun budges in and kills Li when the two are making out but Zhang Wang gets away. Remembering what Wu Song did in Mengzhou, Zhang Shun writes with the blood of Li on the wall a proclamation attributed to An declaring himself to be the killer. When An recovers from his stupour, he has no choice but to go with Zhang Shun to Liangshan.

At Wang Dingliu's inn, Zhang Shun plots with the young man to get back his own on Zhang Wang. Wang Dingliu finds Zhang Wang and hires him as their ferryman. When the boat is midstream, Zhang Shun, who has been hiding his face, overcomes the boatman with the help of Wang Dingliu, ties him up and dumps him into the river. Wang follows Zhang Shun and An Daoquan to Liangshan, where the physician cures Song Jiang of his life-threatening illness.

Campaigns and death
Zhang Shun is appointed as one of the commanders of Liangshan‘s flotilla after the 108 Stars of Destiny came together in what is called the Grand Assembly.

Zhang Shun's swimming skills are pivotal in Liangshan's battle against the army led by Grand Marshal Gao Qiu to wipe out the stronghold. He and his men manage to reach Gao's ships unnoticed by swimming underwater, and proceed to knock holes in their hulls, causing them to sink. As a result, Gao is captured.

After the Liangshan outlaws received amnesty from Emperor Huizong, Zhang Shun participates in the campaigns against the Liao invaders and rebel forces on Song territory ordered by the court.

In the battle of Hangzhou in the campaign against Fang La, Zhang Shun attempts to sneak into the city by climbing over the sluice gate of Yongjin. However, Fang Tianding, Fang La's son, spots him and orders his archers to rain arrows on him. Though killed, Zhang Shun possesses Zhang Heng's body, seeks out Fang Tianding and kills him with the hand of his brother.  His spirit leaves Zhang Heng's body after the revenge.

See also
 List of Water Margin minor characters#Zhang Shun's story for a list of supporting minor characters from Zhang Shun's story.

References
 
 
 
 
 
 
 

36 Heavenly Spirits
Fictional fishers
Fictional characters from Jiangxi